Club Sportivo Ameliano, also simply known as Ameliano, is a Paraguayan football club based in Virgen del Huerto neighborhood in the city of Asunción. The club competes in the Paraguayan Primera División for the 2022 season after their promotion at the end of the 2021 Paraguayan División Intermedia.

The club was home to Alfredo Mazacotte who began his career in the youth teams of the club, and is actually the home of historic striker Marcos Caballero who played for the club from 2003–2021, the player was the leading goal scorer of the Primera División C of 2008 with 11 annotations along with Alberto Cristaldo of Deportivo Recoleta.

The ex-footballer and Argentine coach Oscar Paulin was credited for taking the club to the zone of promotion in 2015 and 2016. He achieved the promotion for the club from the fourth division to the third division in 2015 via a play-off and he put the club in the first position of the third division with two games remaining in the 2016 season – being one point from assuring at least the sub champion – in what is considered as the most successful phase of the club. Ex-goal keeper of the Albirroja Celso Guerrero also was the coach of the club from 2012 to 2013.

The Bluish V has the notability of being recognized by The Guinness Book of Records for the most red cards in one game – referee William Weiler expelled 20 players in a game between Sportivo Ameliano and General Caballero on 1 of June 1993.

History
It was founded on 6 of January 1936, in the zone of Villa Amelia of Asunción, exactly in the same place where today the Institute of Tropical Medicine is ubicated on Venezuela Avenue, in this same place it had its first field of play. Years later, the field was transferred, in the same zone but closer to the Spain Avenue, in this scene it obtained its first official title upon winning the 1959 third division and last division of Paraguayan football in those days. Later, in the decade 1970, moves to a new field of the neighbour suburb called Barrio Jara until 1983 due to the order of the municipality of the sector it goes to Barrio Virgin del Huerto, despite this, the club is popularly identified with Barrio Jara. In this period, constructs the Stadium Jose Tomas Silva, where it is actually exercised as a local today. Later, after many years in the last division of Paraguayan football, in the 1997, with the creation of the División Intermedia as the new second division, the club is one of a few that were sent to the Cuarta Division, the new last level of Paraguayan football for then. In this last category, obtained runner-up in 2000 a part from the promotion to the third division, but the following year, returns to relegation again in 2001.

In 1993, Sportivo Ameliano went into the Guinness Book of Records when in a youth match against General Caballero, a total of an astonishing 20 red cards were shown, the most red cards ever to be dished out in one game. Ian Battersby of The Guardian recorded that "The incident occurred in league match between Sportivo Ameliano and General Caballero in Paraguay. When two Sportivo players were sent off, a 10-minute fight ensued and the referee dismissed a further 18 players. The match, not surprisingly, was abandoned."

On 15 September 2003, Sportivo Ameliano were crowned champions of Paraguay's fourth division after defeated Capitán Figari 2–1. Sportivo Ameliano had been losing 1–0 until Carlos Paredes equalised in the 70th minute and substitute Marcos Caballero scored the winner in the 78th minute.

In 2006, the club obtains promotion again to the Third Division.

In 2013, the club was defeated in a two-legged promotion play-off played between the top four teams of the Paraguayan Primera División C.

In 2015, both Sportivo Ameliano and Deportivo Recoleta gained promotion from the Primera División C to the Primera División B for the 2016 season. It had been in the Primera División C since 2008.

During May of the 2016 Primera División B Metropolitana, long time club striker Marcos Caballero scored in a 1–0 victory vs. Colegiales to put Sportivo Ameliano in the leading clubs at the top of the league table.

On 4 November 2022, Sportivo Ameliano achieved the biggest feat in its history by winning the 2022 Copa Paraguay, beating Nacional on penalty kicks after a 1–1 draw in regular time in the final. By winning the cup, the club also secured an historic qualification to the 2023 Copa Sudamericana as well to the 2022 Supercopa Paraguay against the Primera División champions with better record in the aggregate table.

Stadium
The club's stadium, the Estadio José Tomás Silva, is located one block away from the Universidad Americana, with the respective university being the club's main sponsor. The stadium's date of construction was in 1970 and has a capacity of 2,000. Its average number of spectators is 73.

Honours
Copa Paraguay: 1
2022

Supercopa Paraguay: 1
2022

Segunda de Ascenso/Primera División B: 2
1959, 2019

Primera División C: 2
2003, 2006

Notable players

2000's
 Alfredo Mazacotte
 Marcos Caballero (2003–2021)
2010's
 Fabian Caballero (2013–2014)
 Sergio Escalante (2019–)

Notable coaches
 Pedro Fariña (2003) – Coached club to Fourth division title.
 Celso Guerrero (2012–2013) – Former footballer for Paraguay national team.
 Fabian Caballero (2014) – Former footballer for Arsenal F.C and Dundee F.C and first ever club player-coach.
  Oscar Paulin (2015–) – Coached the club to promotion from Paraguay's Fourth Division in 2015.

References

Football clubs in Paraguay
Football clubs in Asunción
Association football clubs established in 1936
1930s establishments in Paraguay